The following is a list of Southern Line railway stations.

Stations in operation

Closed Stations

Main Line

Khiri Rat Nikhom Branch Line

Kantang Branch Line

Padang Besar Branch Line

See also 
Southern Line (Thailand)
Rail transport in Thailand

References 

Railway stations
Thailand
railway stations
Lists of railway stations